Mount Murchison is a mountain ( above sea level) in Victoria Land, Antarctica. Sources differ as to whether Murchison is the highest peak of the Mountaineer Range; or the second highest if Mount Supernal is considered part of the range.

See also
 List of Ultras of Antarctica

References

External links
 "Mount Murchison, Antarctica" on Peakbagger

Mountains of Victoria Land
Mountaineer Range
Borchgrevink Coast